Starogrigoryevskaya is a rural locality (a stanitsa) in Novogrigoryevskoye Rural Settlement, Ilovlinsky District, Volgograd Oblast, Russia. The population was 192 as of 2010.

Geography 
Starogrigoryevskaya is located 5 km from the right bank of the Don River, 47 km northwest of Ilovlya (the district's administrative centre) by road. Novogrigoryevskaya is the nearest rural locality.

References 

Rural localities in Ilovlinsky District
Don Host Oblast